Jemina Elisabet Rolfo Cristino (born 20 February 1995) is a Uruguayan footballer who plays as a midfielder for CA Peñarol and the Uruguay women's national team.

International career
Rolfo represented Uruguay at the 2012 South American U-17 Women's Championship, the 2012 FIFA U-17 Women's World Cup and the 2014 South American U-20 Women's Championship. She made her senior debut during the 2018 Copa América Femenina  on 4 April that year in a 0–7 loss to Colombia.

References 

1995 births
Living people
Women's association football midfielders
Women's association football forwards
Uruguayan women's footballers
Uruguay women's international footballers
Montevideo Wanderers F.C. players
Colón F.C. players
Peñarol players